William Titcomb Cobb (July 23, 1857 - July 24, 1937) was an American politician and the 46th Governor of Maine.

Biography
William Titcomb Cobb was born in Rockland, Maine on July 23, 1857. He graduated in 1877 from Bowdoin College, where he was admitted to the Zeta Psi fraternity. After completing his graduation, he went to study in Germany. He studied at the Leipzig University and the University of Berlin. After his education in Germany, he returned to the United States and studied law at Harvard Law School. In 1880, he was admitted to the bar. He had a successful legal career.

He was nominated for the governorship of Maine by the Republican party in 1904. He won the general election. He was sworn into governor's office on January 4, 1905. He won the re-election in 1906. During his administration, harsher prohibition laws and economic restructuring was endorsed. Railroad growth was promoted. A meat inspection law and a pure food and drug law were advocated.

Cobb left office on January 6, 1909. He died on July 24, 1937, a day after his 80th birthday, in Rockland, Maine.

Notes

Sources 
 Sobel, Robert and John Raimo. Biographical Directory of the Governors of the United States, 1789-1978. Greenwood Press, 1988. 

1857 births
1937 deaths
People from Rockland, Maine
Bowdoin College alumni
Republican Party governors of Maine
Harvard Law School alumni
Humboldt University of Berlin alumni
Leipzig University alumni
Maine lawyers
19th-century American lawyers
20th-century American lawyers